Aoteatilia psila is a species of sea snail, a marine gastropod mollusk in the family Columbellidae.

Description

Distribution

References

 Suter, H. (1908b) Result of dredging for Mollusca near Cuvier Island, with descriptions of new species. Transactions and Proceedings of the New Zealand Institute, 40, 344–359, pls. 26–27, 30.
 Spencer, H.G., Marshall, B.A. & Willan, R.C. (2009). Checklist of New Zealand living Mollusca. pp 196–219. in: Gordon, D.P. (ed.) New Zealand inventory of biodiversity. Volume one. Kingdom Animalia: Radiata, Lophotrochozoa, Deuterostomia. Canterbury University Press, Christchurch.

psila
Gastropods described in 1908